In My Life is a 1978 Danish drama film written and directed by Bille August (in his directorial debut). It was entered into the 11th Moscow International Film Festival. For her role as Kirsten's mother, Grethe Holmer won the Bodil Award for Best Actress in a Supporting Role.

Plot

Cast 
  as Jens
 Kirsten Olesen as Kirsten
 Jens Okking as Bjarne
 Poul Bundgaard as Kirstens far
 Grethe Holmer as Kirstens mor
  as Bitten
  as Kenneth
 Benno P. Hansen as Sangeren
 Lars Junggren as Brudekjolesælgeren
 Jørgen Kiil as Rejselederen

References

External links 
 

1978 drama films
1978 films
Best Danish Film Bodil Award winners
Danish drama films
1970s Danish-language films
Films directed by Bille August
Films scored by Fuzzy (composer)
1978 directorial debut films